Carlos Fernando Velázquez Castillo (born 2 June 1984) is a former Mexican goalkeeper.

Velázquez made his debut on 29 April 2006 during a 3-2 loss to Cruz Azul in the Clausura 2006 tournament. He later re-appeared, playing for Chiapas on 19 January 2008 during a 2-2 tie against Atlante F.C.

He played with Los Cabos of the Liga de Balompié Mexicano during the league's inaugural season in 2020–21.

References

External links
 
 

1984 births
Living people
Mexican expatriate footballers
Mexican footballers
Association football goalkeepers
Everton de Viña del Mar footballers
Indios de Ciudad Juárez footballers
Mineros de Zacatecas players
Tecos F.C. footballers
Chiapas F.C. footballers
C.F. Pachuca players
Pachuca Juniors footballers
Correcaminos UAT footballers
Alebrijes de Oaxaca players
Cafetaleros de Chiapas footballers
Liga MX players
Ascenso MX players
Chilean Primera División players
Expatriate footballers in Chile
Liga de Balompié Mexicano players